The Edetani were an ancient Iberian (Pre-Roman) people of the Iberian peninsula (the Roman Hispania). They are believed to have spoken a form of the Iberian language.

See also
Iberians
Edeta
Pre-Roman peoples of the Iberian Peninsula
Puntal dels Llops

Bibliography
 Ángel Montenegro et alii, Historia de España 2 - colonizaciones y formación de los pueblos prerromanos (1200-218 a.C), Editorial Gredos, Madrid (1989) 
 Francisco Burillo Mozota, Los Celtíberos, etnias y estados, Crítica, Grijalbo Mondadori, S.A., Barcelona (1998, revised edition 2007)

External links

Detailed map of the Pre-Roman Peoples of Iberia (around 200 BC)

Pre-Roman peoples of the Iberian Peninsula